Janho Engelbrecht is a South African politician and a member of the National Assembly of South Africa for the opposition Democratic Alliance. He had previously served as a member of the Gauteng Provincial Legislature.

Political career
Engelbrecht joined the Democratic Party in 1991 and served as the party's branch chairperson at the Potchefstroom University from 1993 to 1995. In 2006, he was elected as a ward councillor in the City of Tshwane Metropolitan Municipality for the Democratic Alliance. He was selected as the DA's campaign manager for the City of Tshwane for the 2011 municipal elections. The DA caucus managed to grow 47 to 82 members and Engelbrecht was re-elected as a PR councillor at the election. He was then promoted to chief whip of the DA caucus.

In February 2012, Engelbrecht suffered a mild heart attack after a heated argument with African National Congress councillors.

In 2014, he stood for the Gauteng Provincial Legislature as 18th on the DA's list. The DA retained its position as the official opposition in the province and Engelbrecht was elected to the provincial legislature. During his first term, he was a member of the  Governance & Administration Cluster Committees and the  Infrastructure Development Committee.

Engelbrecht was re-elected to the provincial legislature in 2019. He then became a member of the  Roads and Transport Committee and an alternate member of the Economic Development, Environment, Agriculture & Rural Development committee.

On 2 March 2021, Engelbrecht resigned from the Gauteng provincial legislature because the DA selected him to fill the late Belinda Bozzoli's seat in the National Assembly. He was sworn in on 4 March 2021.

Personal life
Engelbrecht lives in Centurion in Gauteng. He has two sons, Cilliers and Jandro.

References

External links
  Mr Janho Engelbrecht at Parliament of South Africa

Living people
Year of birth missing (living people)
Place of birth missing (living people)
People from Pretoria
Afrikaner people
Members of the Gauteng Provincial Legislature
Members of the National Assembly of South Africa
Democratic Alliance (South Africa) politicians
Democratic Party (South Africa) politicians